Staccato Powell is a former Bishop in the African Methodist Episcopal Zion Church. On January 25, 2022, Powell was charged with conspiracy and wire fraud.

References

African Methodist Episcopal Zion Church bishops
Living people
Year of birth missing (living people)